Young Dracula and Young Monsters is a children's fantasy novel by Michael Lawrence. Or it is two such novellas, as an omnibus edition of Young Dracula (2002) and Young Monsters (2003).

Young Dracula, loosely based on the premise explored in Bram Stoker's 1897 horror novel Dracula, follows the light-hearted adventures of Count Dracula's children. The story inspired the CBBC children's drama series Young Dracula.

Young Monsters is set at the Dr Ffelix Ffurter School for Young Monsters, which has real monsters for pupils and teachers.

The book is published by Barrington Stoke, which specializes in books for undeveloped readers.

References

External links

 

2006 British novels
2006 children's books
British children's novels
Children's fantasy novels
Vampire novels